Saint-Pierre-des-Champs (Languedocien: Sant Pèire dels Camps) is a commune in the Aude department in southern France.

Population

Geography
The commune is located in the Corbières Massif.

The village lies on the right bank of the Orbieu, which flows northeast through the western part of the commune.

See also
 Corbières AOC
 Communes of the Aude department

References

Communes of Aude
Aude communes articles needing translation from French Wikipedia